Shawn Tng, 唐志瑋, is a singer and composer from Singapore.

Early life and education 
Tng studied Computer Science at National University of Singapore.

Music career
Tng was part of a Singaporean pop group, Three Springs, comprising Jeremy Wong, Willie Tan and him. Tng was dubbed by Hong Kong's media as the new Eric Moo.
 Tng started his music career with the release his first solo album "相信" in 1994, followed by his second album "觉醒" in 1995.
 Tng wrote a theme song titled "决定" for the popular TCS Channel 8 TV serial "真心男儿".
 In 1995, Tng subsequently launched his singing career in Taiwan releasing his first album there "爱你的我能怎么做".
 In 1995, Tng released a duet with Annie Yi titled "守侯".
Also viewable at "See the Sunrise"
 In 1996, Tng performed the theme song for the animation series Street Fighter (街頭霸王).
 In 1996, Tng participated in the Hong Kong CASH 香港作曲家及作詞家協會 Contest and won the 1st Runner-up.
 In 1997, Liu Wen Zheng(刘文正) named Shawn Tng as one of the rising stars of the Mandarin pop scene in 1996–97.
 In 1997, Yin Xia (银霞) starred in Shawn Tng's 决定 (Decision) music video.
Tng retired from the music scene in 1997.

Career 
Tng joined Microsoft in 1999.

Discography

Albums

Compilation

Featured in

Awards

References

20th-century Singaporean male singers
Singaporean people of Chinese descent
Singaporean composers
Singaporean Mandopop singers
Living people
Year of birth missing (living people)